The 2015 Saint Francis Cougars football team represented the University of Saint Francis, located in Fort Wayne, Indiana, in the 2015 NAIA football season. They were led by head coach Kevin Donley, who served his 18th year as the first head coach in the history of Saint Francis football.  The Cougars played their home games at Bishop John D'Arcy Stadium and were members of the Mid-States Football Association (MSFA) Mideast League (MEL). The Cougars finished as the MSFA MEL champion and received an automatic bid to the NAIA playoffs.

Schedule
(11-1 overall, 6-0 conference)

Game summaries

11/7/2015 - The Cougars originally scheduled a game against Redemption Christian College of Virginia Beach, VA.  When the opponent failed to field a team for the 2015 season, USF found an opening in their schedule.  The opening was filled with a game against the College of Faith, an Arkansas college whose schedule had also previously included Redemption.  The Warriors traveled to Fort Wayne to compete in an exhibition game that did not count in the record or record books of USF.

11/14/2015 - With their 64-6 victory over Missouri Baptist, USF completed the 2015 season as the year's only undefeated team in the regular season of NAIA play.

11/21/2015 - The Cougars opened the 2015 playoff season with a 37-26 win over Reinhardt (GA).  The game was played under adverse weather conditions as a steady, wet snowfall began shortly after the opening kick-off and persisted beyond the end of the game.  For the game, Cougars' running back Justin Green rushed for 252 yards on 32 carries, setting a new single-game record for the victors.  With the win, the Cougars continued their undefeated home playoff record, posting their 19th consecutive victory since their first home playoff victory in 2000.

11/28/2015 - The Cougars continued their home playoff winning streak, stretching it to 20 consecutive wins without a defeat.  This week, the Cougars battled Montana Tech, champions of the Frontier League.  The Cougars prevailed 42-20, marking the first time the team posted a playoff victory against a Frontier League opponent.  After his record-setting game played last week, Justin Green added a second-straight game of rushing for over 200 yards.

12/5/2015 - The experience of the Knights was apparent as the Knights defeated USF 45-14. With the win, the Knights returned to the national championship game for the 2nd consecutive season and the 3rd time in the last 4 seasons. The Knights controlled the game in most all aspects, and they took control by scoring 24 points in a productive 2nd quarter. The loss avenged a regular-season loss to the Cougars which resulted in the Knights finishing in second place in the MEL regular season standings. The loss also ended the Cougars' streak of 20 consecutive playoff home game victories.  Two weeks later, the Knights went on to win their second NAIA football national championship in the last four years.

Ranking movements

References

Saint Francis
Saint Francis Cougars football seasons
Saint Francis Cougars football